William Kehoe (September 12, 1876 – September 17, 1932) was an American lawyer and politician.

Biography
William Kehoe was born in Greenwood (now Elk), California on September 12, 1876. He earned a degree at the University of Michigan and worked as a lawyer. He served as a member of the California State Assembly, representing the 2nd District, from 1908 to 1912. He was then a member of the California State Senate from 1912 to 1920.

He died at his home in Berkeley on September 17, 1932.

References

1876 births
1932 deaths
Republican Party California state senators
Republican Party members of the California State Assembly
People from Mendocino County, California
University of Michigan alumni
20th-century American politicians